Col. John Work House is a historic home located at Montgomery Township in Franklin County, Pennsylvania. It was built about 1775, and is a -story, three bay limestone dwelling with a moderately pitched gable roof.  It represents the typical home of a prosperous late-18th century central Pennsylvania farmer.

It was listed on the National Register of Historic Places in 1979.

References 

Houses on the National Register of Historic Places in Pennsylvania
Houses completed in 1775
Houses in Franklin County, Pennsylvania
National Register of Historic Places in Franklin County, Pennsylvania